Artyom Vladimirovich Samsonov (born 6 February 1989) is a Russian professional footballer. He plays for FC Torpedo Moscow and Torpedo-2.

Career

Club
He made his professional debut in the Russian Football National League in 2007 for FC Torpedo Moscow.

On 23 January 2015, Samsonov signed for Kazakhstan Premier League side FC Irtysh Pavlodar.

Samsonov made his Russian Premier League debut for FC Torpedo Moscow on 17 July 2022 against PFC Sochi.

International
Samsonov was one of the members of the Russian U-17 squad that won the 2006 UEFA U-17 Championship.

Honours
Torpedo Moscow
 Russian Football National League : 2021-22

Career statistics

References

External links
 Profile by Football National League

1989 births
People from Stary Oskol
Sportspeople from Belgorod Oblast
Living people
Russian footballers
Russia youth international footballers
Association football defenders
FC Torpedo Moscow players
FC Dynamo Bryansk players
FC Dynamo Barnaul players
FC Sibir Novosibirsk players
FC Khimik Dzerzhinsk players
FC Irtysh Pavlodar players
FC Energomash Belgorod players
FC Torpedo-2 players
Russian First League players
Russian Second League players
Kazakhstan Premier League players
Russian Premier League players
Russian expatriate footballers
Expatriate footballers in Kazakhstan
Russian expatriate sportspeople in Kazakhstan